Drama is the debut studio album by the British R&B singer Jamelia. It was released by Parlophone Records on 26 June 2000 in the United Kingdom. The album peaked at number 39 on the UK Albums Chart and produced four singles, including the lead single "I Do", the top five hit "Money", and two further singles, "Call Me" and "Boy Next Door".

Critical reception
The Guardian wrote that Drama "proves that the British are capable of making R&B that is soulful, sophisticated and mesmerising."

Track listing

Charts

References

2000 debut albums
Jamelia albums